Jack o' lantern mushroom is a common name for several fungus species in the genus Omphalotus:

 Omphalotus illudens of eastern North America
 Omphalotus olearius occurs in Europe and South Africa
 Omphalotus olivascens of California and Mexico

See also
 Swamp beacon
 Swamp candle (disambiguation)
 Swamp lantern